The discography of American rock band Great White includes nine albums that reached the Billboard 200 album chart and six singles on the magazine's Hot 100.

Studio albums

Live albums 
Recovery: Live! – 1988
Live at the Ritz (promo only) – 1988
Live at the Marquee – 1989
Live in London – 1990
Stage – 1995
Thank You...Goodnight! – 2002
Extended Versions – 2004
Once Bitten, Twice Live – 2006
30 Years – Live from the Sunset Strip – 2013
Live  – 2020

Compilations

Greatest hits 
The Best of Great White: 1986–1992 – 1993
Rock Me – 1998
Gallery – 1999
The Best of Great White – 2000
Latest & Greatest – 2000
Rock Champions – 2000
Greatest Hits – 2001
A Double Dose – 2004
Rock Breakout Years: 1988 – 2005
Rock Me: The Best of Great White – 2006
Great White: The Essential Collection – 2009 (Deadline Music)
Great White: Absolute Hits – 2011 (Capitol Records/EMI)
Great White: Icon – 2013 (Capitol Records/Universal)

Other compilations 
Back Tracks 1986–1991 – 1992
The Final Cuts – 2002
Revisiting Familiar Waters – 2003
Burning House of Love / Love Removal Machine – 2004

Tributes 
Great Zeppelin: A Tribute to Led Zeppelin – 1998
Recover – 2002
Great White Salutes Led Zeppelin – 2005

Other appearances 
Hell Bent Forever: A Tribute to Judas Priest – 2008 (with the song "Diamonds & Rust")

Extended plays 
Out of the Night – 1983
On Your Knees – 1987
The Blue EP – 1991

Singles

Music videos

References 

Discographies of American artists
Heavy metal group discographies